In enzymology, an isopenicillin N epimerase is an enzyme that catalyzes the chemical reaction

isopenicillin N  penicillin N

Hence, this enzyme has one substrate, isopenicillin N, and one product, penicillin N.

This enzyme belongs to the family of isomerases, specifically those racemases and epimerases acting on amino acids and derivatives. The systematic name of this enzyme class is penicillin N 5-amino-5-carboxypentanoyl-epimerase. This enzyme participates in penicillin and cephalosporin biosynthesis.

References

 
 
 
 

EC 5.1.1
Enzymes of unknown structure